Kamarulzaman Hassan (born 17 January 1979) is a former Malaysian footballer. He is a former member of the Malaysian national team. Currently he works as assistant coach and goalkeeping coach in the Petaling Jaya Rangers F.C. football team.

Career
He spend his majority professional career at Penang FA, his birthplace football team. He also played with Malacca FA, Sarawak FA and Proton FC.

National team
Kamarulzaman represented the Malaysia national football team 8 times in 2000, during the height of his career. He made his debut during 2000 Tiger Cup in Thailand. He also represents Malaysia national under-23 football team for the SEA Games.

He, along with Muhamad Khalid Jamlus and Azmin Azram Abdul Aziz, was dropped from the national squad in early 2001 for staying out late at a disco before the 2002 World Cup preliminary games against Qatar, Palestine and Hong Kong.

Perhaps his infamous claim to fame occurs during the 2001 SEA Games in Malaysia, when the Malaysia under 23 team were in the final match against Thailand. With the pressure of winning the first gold medal in football since 1989 SEA Games, also in Malaysia, and in front on the home fans, Kamarulzaman, who until then were playing the best football of his career, made a grave mistake. A harmless cross from Sarawut Treephan, was deflected by Kamarulzaman who try to clear it, into the back of his own net. The goal, three minutes from full-time, proved to be the winning goal for Thailand. Kamarulzaman, blamed for the Malaysia loss, never played for Malaysia again.

Honours

Penang FA
 Malaysia Premier 1 League: 2001
 Malaysia FA Cup: 2002
 Malaysia Charity Shield: 2003

Proton FC
 Malaysia FAM Cup: 2007

References

External links
 

Malaysian footballers
Malaysia international footballers
Living people
1979 births
Penang F.C. players
People from Penang
Association football goalkeepers